Charlotte Fox may refer to:

 Charlotte Fox (mountaineer) (1957–2018), American mountaineer
 Charlotte Kate Fox (born 1985), American actress and musician
 Charlotte Milligan Fox (1864–1916), Irish composer and music collector
 Charlotte Fox, see Bill Cosby sexual assault cases